

Incumbent
Monarch: William III and Mary II

Events
July 12 – Williamite War in Ireland: Battle of Aughrim in County Galway: Protestant Williamite forces led by Godert de Ginkell decisively defeat Jacobites under the Marquis de St Ruth (who is killed).
July 22 – surrender and treaty of Galway.
August–October – Williamite War in Ireland: Siege of Limerick.
October 3 – Treaty of Limerick ends the Williamite War. Its terms are immediately broken by the English.
December 22 – the Flight of the Wild Geese begins, as Patrick Sarsfield, 1st Earl of Lucan leads 19,000 Irish soldiers on ships to France, Spain and onwards to join the armies of Europe.
Sir William Petty's Political Anatomy of Ireland (written 1672) is first published, posthumously in Dublin.

Births
 Seán Clárach Mac Domhnaill, an Irish language poet, in Churchtown, County Cork.

Deaths

August – Claud Hamilton, 4th Earl of Abercorn, Jacobite and soldier, fought at the Battle of the Boyne (b. 1659)
September 18 – Giles Alington, 4th Baron Alington (b. 1680) 
December 30 – Robert Boyle, natural philosopher (b. 1627)

Full date unknown
James Lally, landowner and politician.

References

 
1690s in Ireland
Ireland
Years of the 17th century in Ireland